Trans Provincial Airlines was an airline based in Prince Rupert, British Columbia, Canada, established as Trans Provincial Air Carriers in 1960. On 15 January 1970 TPA acquired Omineca Air Service based at Burns Lake Airport.

TPA was acquired by Harbour Air in 1993.

Fleet
 2- DC-3
 1- Fairchild F27A
 1- Piper Aztec
 1- Beech 18
 7- DHC Beaver
 4- DHC Otter
 5- Grumman Goose
 2- Cessna 185
 1- Cessna 180
 1- Piper Cherokee

See also 
 List of defunct airlines of Canada

References

External links
Harbour Air Seaplanes - Company Bio

Defunct airlines of Canada
Companies based in British Columbia
Transport in Prince Rupert, British Columbia
Airlines established in 1960
Airlines disestablished in 1993
Defunct seaplane operators